is a Japanese actress who is affiliated with Kurata Promotion, Japan Action Enterprise, and T×T. Her real name is 

Filmography

TV series

Films

References

External links
Profile 

Japanese actresses
1971 births
Living people
People from Kyoto Prefecture